Jean-Charles-Joseph Rémond (born in Paris in 1795 and died in Paris in 1875) was a French painter, pupil of Jean-Victor Bertin and Jean-Baptiste Regnault. He won the Prix de Rome award in 1821.

Rémond, who devoted himself to landscape history, ceased to exhibit in 1848.

References 
Encyclopédie Larousse in eight volumes
 Material was translated from the corresponding French Wikipedia article
Benezit Dictionary of Artists

1795 births
1875 deaths
19th-century French painters
French male painters
Prix de Rome for painting
19th-century French male artists